Wheelock Properties Limited and Wheelock Properties (Hong Kong) Limited are subsidiaries of Wheelock and Co. Wheelock Properties is a real estate developer and a former listed company in the Hong Kong stock exchange.

Business overview

Wheelock Properties engages in the property development and investment operations in Hong Kong. It participated in a number of private housing estates including Bellagio, Sorrento, Parc Oasis (via the subsidiary RDC) and Parc Palais and owns certain investment properties including Fitfort.

Before the privatization of Wheelock Properties, the company owned the 76% shares in Singapore-listed Wheelock Properties (Singapore). Both companies are privatized.

History
The predecessor of the business unit, Hongkong Realty and Trust Co., Ltd., was incorporated on 17 March 1923. It was renamed to New Asia Realty and Trust Co., Ltd. in 1995. In the same year  was added as a registered Chinese name.

Hongkong Realty and Trust was a listed company since at least circa 1935. It was reported that circa 1948, Hongkong Realty is majority owned by Marden and Co. already, which the latter is the predecessor of the current Wheelock and Co. Marden-Wheelock was owned by Marden family until the 1980s., which it was takeover by Hong Kong ethnic Chinese business magnate Yue-Kong Pao, the maternal grandfather of the current (as of 2020) Wheelock Properties Managing Director, Douglas Woo.

As a listed subsidiary of the conglomerate Wheelock and Co., New Asia Realty takeover its own listed subsidiary Realty Development Corporation (RDC) in 2002. Both New Asia Realty and RDC also issued class B ordinary share until they were exchanged into class A ordinary shares in 2000.

The listed company was renamed from New Asia to Wheelock Properties Limited in 2004.

Wheelock Properties was privatized by its parent company Wheelock and Co. in 2010. At the time of privatization, Wheelock House in Hong Kong and Wheelock Place in Singapore are the main investment properties of the business unit.

After the privatization , the business unit also do business via another legal person Wheelock Properties (Hong Kong) Limited. In 2016, sister company The Wharf (Holdings) bought a large portion of Wheelock House from the parent company Wheelock & Co. as well as from the chairman Peter Woo and his wife. However, soon after the floor area of Wheelock House was injected to another sister company Wharf Real Estate Investment Company.

The parent company of the business unit, Wheelock and Co., remained as a listed company until 2020.

References

External links

 

Wheelock and Company
Land developers of Hong Kong
Companies formerly listed on the Hong Kong Stock Exchange
Real estate companies established in 1923
1923 establishments in Hong Kong